John Musgrave & Sons was a company that manufactured stationary steam engines.  It was founded in 1839 by John Musgrave and his son, Joseph, at the Globe Ironworks, in Bolton, historically in Lancashire, England.

In 1854 the company supplied a twin cylinder horizontal winding engine, and in 1861 a single cylinder pumping engine to Chanters Colliery in Hindsford. Musgraves supplied winding engines to Wheatsheaf Colliery in 1868,  Mosley Common Colliery in 1870, Brackley Colliery in 1879, Gin Pit Colliery in 1884,  and Nook Colliery in 1913.

The company produced steam engines during the 19th century and between 1899 and 1908 produced 504 large steam-driven engines. The company produced engines and equipment for the coal mining industry and built a boilerworks in Westhoughton in 1900 to produce Lancashire boilers. The Westhoughton works were subject to a chancery court judgement and sold in 1912 leading to the formation of John Musgrave and Sons (1913) Ltd. which kept the Globe Ironworks. The company produced munitions during World War I.

The business closed in 1926; its drawings and patterns were taken over by W & J Galloway & Sons. A final notice of winding-up was published on 11 March 1927.

See also 
 Musgrave non-dead-centre engine
 Hick, Hargreaves & Co. Ltd.

References

Notes

Bibliography

  
 Halton, Maurice J. "The Impact of Conflict and Political Change on Northern Industrial Towns, 1890 to 1990, " MA Dissertation, Faculty of Humanities and Social Science, Manchester Metropolitan University September 2001 (PDF; 326 kB)

Further reading

Industrial Revolution
Steam engine manufacturers
1839 establishments in England
British companies established in 1839
Manufacturing companies established in 1839